John George Goodman (December 28, 1909 – August 8, 1970) was the last amateur golfer to win the U.S. Open,  in 1933, and also won the U.S. Amateur in 1937. 

Born to Lithuanian immigrants in South Omaha, Nebraska, Goodman was orphaned at the age of 14. His mother died when he was 11, after giving birth to her 13th child, and his father later abandoned the family. Goodman became a caddie at the Field Club in Omaha, and while a student at Omaha South High School, he won the Omaha city championship in 1925; four years later, he won the first of three consecutive Nebraska Amateur titles. He won the Trans-Mississippi Amateur three times (1927, 1931, and 1935). He gained national notoriety at age 19 in 1929 when he defeated Bobby Jones in the first round of match play competition at the U.S. Amateur at Pebble Beach.

Goodman served in the U.S. Army during World War II, and did not turn professional until 1960; he supported himself throughout his career by selling insurance. A municipal golf course in Omaha is named for him.

Tournament wins (60)
this list may be incomplete
1925 Omaha Caddie Championship, Omaha Metropolitan Golf Championship
1927 Trans-Mississippi Amateur
1929 Nebraska Amateur
1930 Nebraska Amateur
1931 Trans-Mississippi Amateur, Nebraska Amateur
1933 U.S. Open
1935 Trans-Mississippi Amateur
1936 Mexican Amateur, Arcola Country Club Invitational
1937 U.S. Amateur, Mexican Amateur
1939 Arcola Country Club Invitational

Major championships

Wins (1)

Amateur wins (1)

Results timeline

Note: Goodman never played in The Open Championship or the PGA Championship.

LA = low amateur
NYF = tournament not yet founded
NT = no tournament
CUT = missed the half-way cut
DNQ = did not qualify for match play portion
R128, R64, R32, R16, QF, SF = round in which player lost in match play
"T" indicates a tie for a place

Source for U.S. Open and U.S. Amateur: USGA Championship Database

Source for 1934 British Amateur: Reading Eagle, May 24, 1934, pg. 17.

Source for 1936 Masters: www.masters.com

Source for 1938 British Amateur: Time Magazine, June 6, 1938

U.S. national team appearances
Amateur
Walker Cup: 1934 (winners), 1936 (winners), 1938

References

External links
Washington Post review of The King of Swings: Johnny Goodman, the Last Amateur to Beat the Pros at Their Own Game
Field Club of Omaha Golf and Country Club

American male golfers
Amateur golfers
Winners of men's major golf championships
Golfers from Nebraska
United States Army personnel of World War II
Sportspeople from Omaha, Nebraska
People from South Gate, California
1909 births
1970 deaths